La Copa Junior (2012) (Spanish for "The Junior Cup") was a professional wrestling tournament produced and scripted by the Mexican wrestling promotion Consejo Mundial de Lucha Libre (CMLLl; Spanish "World Wrestling Council"). The tournament ran from November 30, 2012 to December 14, 2012, in Arena México in Mexico City, Mexico. CMLL's recurring La Copa Junior tournament featured second, third or fourth generation wrestlers completing against each other. The 2012 version of the La Copa Junior was the fifth tournament held by CMLL.

For the 2012 La Copa Junior tournament, CMLL chose to hold two qualifying 10-man torneo cibernetico elimination matches to determine the finalists. La Sombra won Block A by lastly eliminating Volador Jr., while Tama Tonga won Block B by eliminating Shocker to qualify for the finals. The finals of the tournament was the main event of the 2012 Sin Piedad supercard show and was won by La Sombra, two falls to one.

Production

Background
Starting in 1996 the Mexican professional wrestling promotion Consejo Mundial de Lucha Libre ("World Wrestling Council"; CMLL) held their first ever La Copa Junior tournament. CMLL held the tournament to celebrate the fact that lucha libre in Mexico is often a family tradition, with a large number of second, third, or even fourth generation wrestlers following the footsteps of their relatives. The premise of the tournament is that all participants are second-generation or more, although at times the family relationship is a storylines family relationship and not an actual one. One example of this is Dragón Rojo Jr. being billed as the grandson of Dragón Rojo, when in reality that is simply a storyline created by CMLL. The original La Copa Junior was won by  Héctor Garza.

CMLL would not hold another La Copa Junior until the 2005 tournament (won by Shocker), followed by a 2006 tournament won by Dos Caras Jr. The tournament did not return until 2010 where Dragón Rojo Jr. won the 2010 version. In 2012 third-generation luchador La Sombra won the Junior cup

In 2014, CMLL held two La Copa Junior tournaments, first a tournament on January 1, won by Super Halcón Jr., followed by a VIP tournament, featuring higher card wrestlers than the usual tournaments, which was won by Máximo The semi-regular tournament returned in 2016, won by Esfinge In 2017, Soberano Jr. won the La Copa Junior Nuevos Valores

Storylines
The tournament featured a number of professional wrestling matches with different wrestlers involved in pre-existing scripted feuds, plots and storylines. Wrestlers were portrayed as either heels (referred to as rudos in Mexico, those that portray the "bad guys") or faces (técnicos in Mexico, the "good guy" characters) as they followed a series of tension-building events, which culminated in a wrestling match or series of matches.

Family relationship

Tournament
CMLL brought the La Copa Junior tournament back in late 2012, holding the tournament spread out over two CMLL Super Viernes shows and the finals as the main event of the 2012 Sin Piedad. The two qualifying rounds took place on the November 30, 2012 and the Super Viernes December 7, 2012. CMLL decided to change the tournament format for the 2012 version, instead adopting their normal tournament format, with two qualifying torneo cibernetico, multi-man elimination matches, with the winner of each match advancing to the finals. Each of the qualifying blocks consisted of 10 second-generation wrestlers for a total of 20 competitors over all, the highest number of competitors in any of the La Copa Junior tournaments. The first qualifying block was won by La Sombra, lastly eliminating his longtime rival Volador Jr. to earn his spot in the finals. The second qualifying block was won by New Japan Pro-Wrestling (NJPW) representative Tama Tonga as he eliminated Shocker to earn his spot in the finals. The final match was the only match contested under two out of three falls that saw La Sombra defeat Tama Tonga two falls to one to win the 2012 La Copa Junior tournament.

Order of elimination

Results

November 30

December 7

December 14

References

2012 in professional wrestling
2012 in Mexico
CMLL La Copa Junior
December 2012 events in Mexico